The AN/APQ-181 is an all-weather, low probability of intercept (LPI) phased array radar system designed by Hughes Aircraft (now Raytheon) for the U.S. Air Force B-2A Spirit bomber aircraft. The system was developed in the mid-1980s and entered service in 1993. The APQ-181 provides a number of precision targeting modes, and also supports terrain-following radar and terrain avoidance.  The radar operates in the Ku band (a subset of the J band). The original design uses a TWT-based transmitter with a 2-dimensional passive electronically scanned array (PESA) antenna.

In 1991, the B-2 Industrial Team (including Hughes as a major subcontractor) was awarded the Collier Trophy in recognition of the "design, development, production, and flight testing of the B-2 aircraft, which has contributed significantly to America's enduring leadership in aerospace and the country's future national security."

In 2002, Raytheon was awarded a contract to develop a new, active electronically scanned array (AESA) version of the APQ-181. This upgrade will improve system reliability, and will also eliminate potential conflicts in frequency usage between the B-2 and commercial satellite systems that also use the J band. 

In 2008 the Federal Communications Commission accidentally sold the APQ-181 frequency to a commercial user resulting in the need for installing new radar arrays at a cost of over $1 billion. All B-2 aircraft are expected to have the upgraded radar by 2010.

See also
 List of radars
 Joint Electronics Type Designation System (JETDS)

References

External links
Raytheon product description
spacedaily.com article

Aircraft radars
Raytheon Company products
Radars of the United States Air Force
Military radars of the United States
Military equipment introduced in the 1990s